"Lucky Days" is South Korean boy band SS501's third Japanese maxi single. It was released on June 18, 2008 by Pony Canyon.

The album consists of three songs, "Lucky Days", "Summer Blue", and "Hoshizora" and an instrumental version of each track.

Track listing

 NOTE: For the limited editions, "Hoshizora" track is not available.

Music videos
 "Lucky Days"

Release history

References

External links

 
 

SS501 songs
2008 singles
2008 songs
Pony Canyon singles
Song articles with missing songwriters